The Joseph Smith Hypocephalus (also known as the Hypocephalus of Sheshonq) was a papyrus fragment, part of a larger collection of papyri known as the Joseph Smith Papyri, found in the Gurneh area of Thebes, Egypt, around the year 1818. The owner's name, Sheshonq, is found in the hieroglyphic text on said hypocephalus. Three hypocephali in the British Museum (37909, 8445c, and 8445f) are similar to the Joseph Smith Hypocephalus both in layout and text and were also found in Thebes.

A woodcut image of the hypocephalus was initially published on March 15, 1842, in Volume III, No. 10 of the Latter Day Saint newspaper Times and Seasons, two years before the death of Joseph Smith, who was the editor of the Times and Seasons. This image is included as one of several appendices to the Book of Abraham, where it is called Facsimile No. 2. The Book of Abraham has been considered scripture by members of the Church of Jesus Christ of Latter-day Saints (LDS Church) since 1880. The location of the original document is unknown.

Hypocephali 

Hypocephali are small disk-shaped objects, generally made of stuccoed linen, but also of papyrus, bronze, gold, wood, or clay, which ancient Egyptians from the Late Period onwards placed under the heads of their dead.

They were believed to protect the deceased, causing the head and body to be enveloped in light and warmth, thereby making the deceased divine. Hypocephali symbolized the Eye of Ra (later the Eye of Horus), which represented the sun, and the scenes portrayed on them relate to Egyptian ideas of resurrection and life after death, connecting them with the Osirian resurrection myth.

To the ancient Egyptians, the daily setting and rising of the sun was a symbol of death and rebirth. The hypocephalus represented all that the sun encircles — the world of the living, over which it passed during the day, was depicted in the upper half, and that of the dead, which it crossed during the night, in the lower portion.

They were part of the burial materials created by Egyptians from the Twenty-sixth Dynasty onward and are considered anachronistic to the time period that Abraham would have lived. Chapter 162 of the Book of the Dead version of that period contain directions for the making and use of hypocephali.

LDS Scholar Royal Skousen has argued that Smith made a mistake when he connected the facsimiles to the revealed text. For Skousen, sentences referencing the facsimiles were interlinear or margin notes that were not part of the actual revealed text. As such, he believes the facsimiles themselves are not part of the Book of Abraham and are extracanonical.
 
Within the large circle of hypocephali are compartments containing hieroglyphic text and figures which are extracts from Chapter CLXII of the Egyptian Book of the Dead. P. J. de Horrack stated that the scenes portrayed in hypocephali relate in all their details to the resurrection and the renewed birth after death...symbolized by the course of the Sun, the living image of divine generation. The circle is divided to represent two celestial hemispheres and the cycle of renewal.

Lacunae and reconstructions
As stated by LDS Egyptologist Michael D. Rhodes:

Interpretation of images (Figures No. 1-7, 22-23)
There is still some ambiguity regarding how these Egyptian names and text may have been pronounced.

The numbers labeling the figures were added to correspond to explanations of the images and text given by Joseph Smith.

Figure No. 1

Figure 1 has been described as the god Re-Atum, typically depicted with four heads. The original copy is missing the head portion of this figure, and it is possible Smith copied the heads and shoulders of Figure 2.

Left of center is the was scepter, or DJAM scepter.

Joseph Smith explained figure 1 as;

Figures No. 22 and 23
Figures 22 and 23 are apes with lunar disks appearing above their heads.

Joseph Smith explained figures 22 and 23 as: "the medium of Kli-flos-is-es, or Hah-ko-kau-beam, the stars represented by numbers (figures) 22 and 23, receiving light from the revolutions of Kolob."

Figure No. 2

On this shoulders are jackal heads. In his left hand is the staff of Wepwawet. The figure to the right was not present in the damaged original.

Joseph Smith stated that this figure;

Michael D. Rhodes identified the hieroglyphs to below as: "The name of this Mighty God."

Figure No. 3

Figure 3 is located in the missing section of the hypocephalus.  Prior to printing, the section was filled in.  The text on the rim surrounding the figure has been replaced by text from the unrelated Breathing Permit of Hôr.  Similarly, figure 3 is also foreign to the hypocephalus. As Hugh Nibley noted, "The boat in the picture is identical with another piece of Joseph Smith Papyrus, namely JSP IV, which accompanies chapter 101 of the Book of the Dead."  Despite the striking resemblance, Nibley and some other apologists feel that the boat is inspired, because boats sometimes do appear in that section on hypocephali. Egyptologists dispute this, arguing that just like the surrounding text, the inclusion by Joseph Smith (or his engravers) is irrelevant.

A solar barque carrying the seated falcon headed god Re, holding a was scepter. The solar disk is over Re's head. A divine Eye of Horus is on both sides of Re and the solar barque.

Also on the barque is an offering stand. The two characters farthest to the left may be an attempt to engrave dp.t ntr, which would translate as "Divine Ship":
R8-P1

Joseph Smith's interpretation:

Figure No. 4

A falcon, representing Sokar sitting on a mummy case, with outstretched wings, sitting upon a papyrus boat. The Coffin Texts state; "He takes the ship of 1000 cubits from end to end and he sails it to the stairway of fire."

Joseph Smith's interpretation:

Figure No. 5

A cow, representing Hathor, the heavenly cow. Behind is a standing female figure with the Eye of Horus depicted on her head and holding out a water lily in her left hand.

Joseph Smith's interpretation:

Figure No. 6

Four standing figures, representing the four sons of Horus. They are the patron gods of the lungs, liver, stomach and intestines, and were the gods of the four quarters of the earth.

Joseph Smith's interpretation: "Represents this earth in its four quarters."

Figure No. 7

This figure has been identified with Min or the god Amon.  To the left is a figure with a bird's head, presenting the Eye of Ra, identified as Nehebka or Nehebkau, a provider of life and nourishment.

Joseph Smith's interpretation:

Text to the left (Figures No. 8-11)

Theodule Deveria gave the following translation: "O great God in Sekhem; O great God, Lord of heaven, earth and hell. ... Osiris S'es'enq."

Michael D. Rhodes gives the following translation: "O God of the Sleeping Ones from the time of the creation.  O Mighty God, Lord of heaven and earth, of the hereafter, and of his great waters, may the soul of the Osiris Shishaq be granted life."

Robert K. Ritner gives the following translation: "O noble god from the beginning of time, great god, lord of heaven, earth, underworld, waters [and mountains,] cause the ba-spirit of the Osiris Sheshonq to live." (brackets and italics in original)

Joseph Smith said of figure 8 in particular, "Contains writings that cannot be revealed unto the world; but is to be had in the Holy Temple of God."

Text to the right (Figures No. 12-15)

The right portion of these characters are hieratic and appear to have been copied from Joseph Smith Papyrus XI.

Included is sn-sn:

N35:O34-N35:O34

Val Sederholm has identified that the surviving traces of the original content parallel other hypocephali, and suggested the reading j nTr pfy 'A, 'nx m TAw, jw m mw: 'q r' jw [=r] sDm md.t=f. [Mj n] Wsjr, explaining that "the officiator, calling upon that special, particular, transcendent god, who lives by breathing, who negotiates the waters, pleads from the depths: May Re descend to hear Osiris' words! Come to Shoshenq, who is dead!"

Text at the bottom (Figures No. 16-17)

Michael D. Rhodes gives the following translation: "May this tomb never be desecrated, and may this soul and its lord never be desecrated in the hereafter."

Robert K. Ritner gives the following translation: "Back, injury, back! There is none who attacks you. This ba-spirit and his lord will not be attacked in the underworld forever."

Text around the rim (Figure No. 18)
One third of the rim contains characters taken from another papyrus.

Michael D. Rhodes provided a possible reading of the text in its original state:

Ritner translated it as:

Text to upper left (Figures No. 19-21, numbered 19,21-22 in Times and Seasons)

Rhodes gives the following translation: "You shall ever be as that God, the Busirian."

See also

 Archaeology and the Book of Mormon
 Book of Abraham Egyptian mummies
 Critical appraisal of the Book of Abraham
 Joseph Smith Papyri
 Kirtland Egyptian papers
 Kolob

Notes

References

External links 
 

1842 documents
Book of Abraham
Book of the Dead
Egyptian papyri containing images
Pearl of Great Price (Mormonism)
Works originally published in Times and Seasons